The Bicentennial Cup Tournament was an international association football competition, which took place in May 1976 in the United States. The tournament featured several World Cup stars both past and future.

The tournament - which celebrated the 200th anniversary of the U.S. Declaration of Independence - came about after England and Italy failed to qualify for the 1976 European Championship tournament.  These two teams joined Brazil and Team America, a side composed of stars playing in the North American Soccer League.

The U.S. team of the time was not developed enough to compete against sides as powerful as Brazil, Italy and England, and hence Team America, consisting of players of various nationalities drawn from North American Soccer League clubs, carried the U.S. banner in the tournament. Team America included players who had performed for other national teams, among them Pelé, Ramon Mifflin, Mike England, Giorgio Chinaglia and Bobby Moore.   

The day after England played Team America, the Football Association, asked about the match's status, said it was regarded as "a training game" and that caps would not be awarded to the participating players. Accordingly, the FA does not include the match in its list of full internationals. The associations of both Brazil and Italy, on the other hand, listed their national sides' matches against Team America as full internationals.  Matches against Team America would not meet the new standard FIFA set down in January, 2001 for official full internationals because they were not played between the selections of two FIFA country members. FIFA has retroactively removed the official status of matches involving other multinational all-star selections, including England's matches against the Rest of Europe and the Rest of the World (although the FA continues to recognize these as official internationals).  

Brazil won the cup, winning all three of their games, while England came second, winning two and losing one; 1–0 against Brazil.

Results
All times local

Table

Statistics

Goalscorers

External links 
USA Bicentennial Cup Tournament results & table
RSSSF
All Matches Brazil National Team

1976
1976 in American soccer
1975–76 in English football
1975–76 in Italian football
1976 in Brazilian football
1976 U.S.A. Bicentennial Cup Tournament
May 1976 sports events in the United States
International men's association football invitational tournaments